Mirpur Cantonment is a Bangladesh military cantonment located in Mirpur Thana, Dhaka. Mirpur DOHS is located beside the cantonment.

Institutions
National Defence College
Defence Services Command and Staff College
Inter Service Selection Board - ISSB 
Bangladesh University of Professionals
Military Institute of Science and Technology
6th Independent Air Defence Artillery Brigade
Mirpur Cantonment Public School and College (MCPSC)

Education
Bangladesh University of Professionals
Military Institute of Science and Technology (MIST)

References

Cantonments of Bangladesh
Organisations based in Dhaka